The 2012–13 Boston College Eagles men's basketball team represented Boston College during the 2012–13 NCAA Division I men's basketball season. The Eagles were led by third year head coach Steve Donahue. The team played its home games at the Conte Forum on the campus of Boston College in Chestnut Hill, MA. Boston College competed in the Atlantic Coast Conference. They finished the season 16–17, 7–11 in ACC play to finish in eighth place. They lost in the quarterfinals of the ACC tournament to Miami (FL).

Departures

Recruiting

Roster

Schedule and Results 

|-
!colspan=9| Regular season

|-
!colspan=9|2013 ACC tournament

References

Boston College
Boston College Eagles men's basketball seasons
Boston College Eagles men's basketball
Boston College Eagles men's basketball
Boston College Eagles men's basketball
Boston College Eagles men's basketball